Bujeon station may refer to two train stations in Busan, South Korea:

 Bujeon station (Korail), in Seomyeon, terminus of the Bujeon and Donghae lines
 Bujeon station (Busan Metro),  in Bujeon-dong, Busanjin, on Busan Metro line 1